Ravenna is a city in Buffalo County, Nebraska, United States. It is part of the Kearney, Nebraska Micropolitan Statistical Area. The population was 1,441 at the 2020 census.

History
Ravenna was founded in 1886 when the Burlington Railroad was extended to that point. It was named after the city of Ravenna, Italy, and many of Ravenna's street names commemorate other Italian places.

Ravenna was incorporated in October 1886.

Geography
Ravenna is located at  (41.027700, -98.913347).

Climate

Demographics

2010 census
As of the census of 2010, there were 1,360 people, 575 households, and 338 families living in the city. The racial makeup of the city was 98.2% White, 0.2% Native American, 0.4% Asian, and 1.3% from two or more races. Hispanic or Latino of any race were 2.0% of the population.

There were 575 households, of which 29.6% had children under the age of 18 living with them, 48.0% were married couples living together, 8.0% had a female householder with no husband present, 2.8% had a male householder with no wife present, and 41.2% were non-families. 35.8% of all households were made up of individuals, and 17.6% had someone living alone who was 65 years of age or older. The average household size was 2.30 and the average family size was 3.05.

The median age in the city was 40.9 years. 25.9% of residents were under the age of 18; 6.3% were between the ages of 18 and 24; 22.7% were from 25 to 44; 25.6% were from 45 to 64; and 19.5% were 65 years of age or older. The gender makeup of the city was 48.5% male and 51.5% female.

2000 census
As of the census of 2000, there were 1,341 people, 534 households, and 349 families living in the city. The population density was 1,782.0 people per square mile (690.4/km). There were 600 housing units at an average density of 797.3 per square mile (308.9/km). The racial makeup of the city was 98.96% White, 0.15% Asian, 0.37% from other races, and 0.52% from two or more races. Hispanic or Latino of any race were 0.82% of the population.

There were 534 households, out of which 32.4% had children under the age of 18 living with them, 55.4% were married couples living together, 7.7% had a female householder with no husband present, and 34.5% were non-families. 31.5% of all households were made up of individuals, and 18.7% had someone living alone who was 65 years of age or older. The average household size was 2.39 and the average family size was 3.02.

In the city, the population was spread out, with 26.9% under the age of 18, 6.1% from 18 to 24, 26.1% from 25 to 44, 17.0% from 45 to 64, and 23.9% who were 65 years of age or older. The median age was 39 years. For every 100 females, there were 83.4 males. For every 100 females age 18 and over, there were 77.2 males.

As of 2000 the median income for a household in the city was $31,875, and the median income for a family was $39,609. Males had a median income of $31,111 versus $19,226 for females. The per capita income for the city was $15,953. About 3.7% of families and 7.6% of the population were below the poverty line, including 7.5% of those under age 18 and 13.7% of those age 65 or over.

Culture and events
Ravenna is host to the annual city celebration named Annevar (Ravenna spelled backwards). Each year, the celebration includes a demolition derby, tractor pull, and other local recreational activities.

During the solar eclipse of August 21, 2017, approximately 8,000 visitors came to the town from all of the United States and as far away as Europe, Japan, and Australia.

References

External links
 Official Site

Cities in Nebraska
Cities in Buffalo County, Nebraska
Kearney Micropolitan Statistical Area